The football rivalry between Vietnam and Thailand today is always considered as one sporting rivalry between the two best football countries in Southeast Asia by many people, especially by football fans in these two countries; to determine whether which one is best in this region (although Australia a country outside Southeast Asia geographically has been best among the AFF members since joining on August 27, 2013). As the most important part of the rivalry, Thailand and Vietnam are also sporting rivals. Both teams have faced each other in 55 matches since 1956. In overall, Vietnam defeated Thailand 23 times, compared with 20 Thai's victories over the Vietnamese. As one of the most popular rivalries of Southeast Asia and Asia, the matches between Vietnam and Thailand are always highly anticipated by supporters of these two countries.

Background
The football rivalry between Thailand and Vietnam likely originated from the Siamese–Vietnamese wars and conflicts that lasted for many centuries, due to the long military tradition and the economic rivalry of the two countries, which later expanded into football. There is also a significant difference between Vietnamese footballers and supporters as well as the Vietnamese press and media when refusing to acknowledge the current domination of Thai football in Southeast Asia, unlike the rest of Southeast Asia that often consider Thailand as the strongest team, which further develops the importance of the rivalry between these two teams. In fact, Thailand is generally more successful than Vietnam in international competitions, but Vietnamese achievements are better in some certain tournaments. Since the 21st century, although Thailand has qualified for the AFC Asian Cup more than Vietnam, its performances in the final tournament were often worse than Vietnam, who has, in some aspect, ability to culminate surprise results despite disadvantages Vietnam endured in a number of competitions, while Thailand, due to its leading status in Southeast Asia, has a harder time to do the same toward stronger opponents. Most notably, the 2007 AFC Asian Cup when Vietnam, despite being the lowest-ranked team in the competition and Vietnam's group contained three champions, turned to be the lone host country to reach the knockout phase while Thailand failed to achieve the same. Also, in the 2019 AFC Asian Cup, Vietnam again reached the quarterfinals while Thailand lost in the round of 16.

This is one of the most popular rivalries in the ASEAN region and is often referred as the "El Clásico" or "Battle" of Southeast Asia, because both teams are commonly considered as the two strongest teams in the regional competitions. The matches between Thailand and Vietnam always attract the large numbers of press, media, supporters of the two countries as well as other countries of Southeast Asia and Asia. However, the rivalry has grown differently from time to time. During the period against the South Vietnam, Thailand had a worse performance when they only won 4 matches compared to 20 wins of former South Vietnam. However, when Vietnam has been unified and its national team returned to international football in 1991, Thailand has showed a far domination against Vietnam when it got 17 wins, 8 draws, and only 3 losses. However, the overall performance from the first ever match of both countries since 1956 until now is still a disadvantage for Thailand against Vietnam, with only 21 wins compared to 23 losses and 12 draws. In the most recent confrontation between these two teams in the 2022 AFF Championship second leg final, the Thais won 1–0 and 3–2 on aggregate. The teams met each other again in the 2022 AFF Championship Final, 15 years after the 2008 AFF Championship final.

Vietnam's most memorable win against Thailand since its reintegration was in the 2008 AFF Championship final, when a 2–1 win in the first leg in Bangkok set them up for their first ever regional title, which they secured after a 1–1 draw in Hanoi.

Lists of matches

Statistics

Honours

Top goalscorers
As of 26 December 2021 
Players in bold are still active for the national team

Overall

Women's matches
Like their men's counterparts, the two nations also have a strong rivalry in the women's counterparts, with both Thailand women's national football team and Vietnam women's national football team among ASEAN's strongest, Vietnam has a winning record against Thailand in women's matches, with 18 wins compared to 9 losses and 9 draws.

See also
Myanmar–Thailand football rivalry
Indonesia–Malaysia football rivalry
List of association football rivalries

References

Thailand national football team
Vietnam national football team
Thailand–Vietnam relations
1956 establishments in Asia
International association football rivalries